Undulambia dendalis is a moth in the family Crambidae. It is found in Guatemala.

References

Moths described in 1896
Musotiminae